Past and present television personalities on The Sports Network.

Current

Analysts
Jack Armstrong – Basketball analyst
Janine Beckie - Soccer analyst
Craig Button – TSN Hockey Director of Scouting
Steven Caldwell – Soccer analyst
Darren Dreger – TSN Hockey insider / studio analyst
Julian de Guzman – Soccer analyst
Matt Dunigan – CFL on TSN studio analyst / colour analyst
Duane Forde – CFL on TSN colour analyst
Cathy Gauthier – Curling on TSN colour analyst
Mike Johnson – TSN Hockey studio analyst / colour analyst
Russ Howard – Curling on TSN colour analyst
Kevin Kilbane - Soccer analyst
Pierre LeBrun – TSN Hockey insider
Bob McKenzie – TSN Hockey insider / studio analyst
Jamie McLennan – TSN Hockey studio analyst / colour analyst
Jeff O'Neill – TSN Hockey studio analyst
Jesse Palmer – NFL on TSN analyst
Steve Phillips – baseball insider
Dave Poulin  – TSN Hockey studio analyst
Leo Rautins – Basketball analyst
Davis Sanchez – CFL on TSN contributor
Kevin Sawyer – Hockey analyst
Milt Stegall – CFL on TSN studio analyst
Glen Suitor – CFL on TSN colour analyst
Bob Weeks – Golf analyst

Anchors/Hosts
Kate Beirness – SportsCentre anchor / CFL on TSN studio host
Tessa Bonhomme - SportsCentre anchor / TSN Hockey fill-in studio host
Darren Dutchyshen – SportsCentre anchor / TSN Hockey fill-in studio host
James Duthie – TSN Hockey studio host
Kayla Grey – SportsCentre anchor/reporter
Jennifer Hedger – SportsCentre anchor
Bryan Mudryk – SportsCentre anchor
Jay Onrait - SC with Jay Onrait host
Gino Reda – That's Hockey host / TSN Hockey fill-in studio host (SportsCentre: Insider Trading)
Rod Smith – SportsCentre anchor
Cory Woron – SportsCentre anchor

Play-by-play
Dennis Beyak – International hockey play-by-play
 Dan Robertson – Jets on TSN play-by-play
Matt Devlin – Raptors on TSN play-by-play
Gord Miller – Leafs on TSN, Sens on TSN, World Junior / World Hockey Championships and CFL on TSN play-by-play (also appears on ESPN)
Bryan Mudryk – Habs on TSN play-by-play, Curling on TSN play-by-play (morning draw) 
Vic Rauter – Curling on TSN, MLS on TSN play-by-play
Rod Smith – CFL on TSN play-by-play

Reporters
Paul Hollingsworth - Atlantic reporter
Farhan Lalji – Vancouver reporter
Ryan Rishaug – Edmonton reporter

Former

Analysts
Jock Climie – CFL on TSN studio analyst
Gurdeep Ahluwalia – SportsCentre anchor
David Archer – CFL on TSN colour analyst
Matthew Barnaby – hockey analyst
Cheryl Bernard - Season of Champions on TSN analyst 
Kerry Fraser – NHL refereeing analyst
Less Browne – CFL on TSN studio analyst
Dirk Hayhurst – baseball analyst
Peter Burwash – tennis analyst
Aaron Ward - TSN Hockey studio analyst 
Jason de Vos – Toronto FC and MLS colour analyst
Marc Crawford – NHL on TSN studio analyst
Terry Dunfield – soccer analyst
Brian Engblom – Jets on TSN color analyst
Ray Ferraro - TSN Hockey colour/studio analyst 
Gary Green – NHL on TSN colour analyst
Glenn Healy – NHL on TSN colour analyst
Shane Hnidy – Jets on TSN colour analyst
Dick Howard – soccer colour analyst
Mike Keenan – NHL on TSN studio analyst
Tony Kubek – Toronto Blue Jays colour analyst
Kristian Jack – soccer analyst
Paul LaPolice — CFL on TSN studio analyst
Graham Leggat – soccer color analyst
Craig MacTavish – NHL on TSN studio analyst
Maggie the Macaque – NHL on TSN playoff prognosticator
Buck Martinez – Toronto Blue Jays colour analyst
Pierre McGuire - TSN Hockey game/studio analyst 
Danny McManus – CFL on TSN colour analyst
Mike Milbury – NHL on TSN studio analyst
Linda Moore —Curling on TSN colour analyst
Harry Neale – Toronto Maple Leafs on TSN colour analyst
Roger Neilson – NHL on TSN colour analyst
Bob O'Billovich – CFL on TSN studio analyst
Darren Pang — NHL on TSN studio analyst
Michael Peca – NHL on TSN studio analyst
Leif Pettersen – CFL on TSN colour analyst
Vera Pezer – curling colour analyst
Warren Sawkiw – Montreal Expos colour analyst
Chris Schultz – CFL on TSN studio analyst
Dan Shulman – March Madness on TSN studio analyst; also featured in SportsCentre segments (former Toronto Blue Jays, NHL on TSN, CHL on TSN and NBA on TSN play-by-play; now play-by-play for ESPN, although TSN may simulcast games he calls)
Ken Singleton – Toronto Blue Jays colour analyst
Pat Tabler – Toronto Blue Jays analyst
Eric Tillman – CFL on TSN studio analyst
John Tortorella – NHL on TSN studio analyst
Ray Turnbull – Curling on TSN colour analyst
Ryan Walter – NHL on TSN colour analyst
Bill Watters – NHL on TSN studio analyst
Henry Burris – CFL on TSN analyst
Tracy Wilson – Figure Skating colour analyst
Jabari Greer – NFL on TSN analyst

Anchors/Hosts
David Amber – SportsCentre anchor
Thea Andrews – Guys TV host
Rod Black – CFL on TSN, Women's World Hockey Championships and Figure Skating play-by-play
Brendan Connor – SportsCentre anchor
Dave Hodge – The Reporters host
Mark Jones – SportsCentre anchor
Steve Kouleas — That's Hockey 2Nite host
Terry Leibel – SportsDesk anchor
Dan O'Toole - SC with Jay and Dan co-host
Dan Pollard – SportsCentre anchor
David Pratt – Last Call host
Blake Price - anchor
Dave Randorf - SportsCentre anchor, CFL on TSN studio host
Lorne Rubenstein – Acura World of Golf host
Natasha Staniszewski – SportsCentre anchor
Mike Toth – SportsDesk anchor and Baseball Tonight host
Jim Van Horne – SportsDesk anchor and NHL on TSN studio host
John Wells – NHL on TSN studio host, SportsDesk anchor, TSN Sunday host
Brian Williams - Olympic Games host, figure skating host and CFL on TSN contributor.

Play-by-play
Don Chevrier – curling play by play
Chris Cuthbert - CFL on TSN and TSN Hockey play-by-play
Jim Hughson – NHL on TSN, Montreal Expos, and Toronto Blue Jays play-by-play
Tommy Hutton – Montreal Expos play-by-play
Fergie Olver – Toronto Blue Jays play-by-play
Dave Randorf— NHL on TSN, CFL on TSN, Montreal Canadiens on TSN, and World Hockey Championships play-by-play
Paul Romanuk – NHL on TSN play-by-play, CHL on TSN play-by-play
John Saunders – Toronto Raptors play-by-play
Chuck Swirsky – Toronto Raptors play-by-play
Jerry Trupiano – World League of American Football play-by-play
Dave Van Horne – Montreal Expos play-by-play

Reporters
Lisa Bowes – Winnipeg and Calgary reporter
Shawn Churchill - Winnipeg reporter
James Cybulski – Toronto reporter
Michael Farber– Montreal reporter
Sheri Forde — Toronto reporter
Nancy Newman – SportsDesk reporter
Frank Seravalli - Senior Hockey reporter 
Alex J. Walling – Halifax/Atlantic Canada reporter
Sara Orlesky – Winnipeg reporter, JETS on TSN host

See also
List of NHL on TSN commentating crews

References

External links
 

Personalities
The Sports Network